Lisa Papineau is an American musician and songwriter. She has released four solo albums, and is the songwriter and vocalist for Los Angeles band Big Sir. Papineau is a frequent collaborator of Japanese composer Jun Miyake and has also written songs for and recorded with other bands and solo artists, including Air, M83, Halo Orbit, ME & LP, Renaud-Gabriel Pion, Jam Da Silva, Dinho Ouro Preto, Anubian Lights, Farflung, P.O.D., Omar Rodríguez-López, Scapegoat Wax, Scenario Rock, Arman Méliès, Mandrake, Sissy Bar, and Crooked Cowboy and the Freshwater Indians.

Papineau received initial recognition when her band Pet, co-founded with composer Tyler Bates, was featured on The Crow: City of Angels soundtrack, and later the Blue Note Records soundtrack for The Last Time I Committed Suicide. Pet's self-titled album was executive-produced by Tori Amos.

Papineau was born in Providence, Rhode Island. She has multiple sclerosis.

Discography
Night Moves (Productions Spéciales, 2005)
Red Trees (Yellowbird, 2009)
Blood Noise (Neurotic Yell Records, 2013)
Oh Dead On Oh Love (Hornbuckle Records, 2019)

References

External links
 
 Lisa Papineau's website is offline since April 2013. 
 Lisa Papineau's blog
 
 Last.fm
 Wikimusicguide
 Song "The Here and After" Music: Jun Miyake; lyrics and vocal: Lisa Papineau

Living people
Year of birth missing (living people)
American women singer-songwriters
American singer-songwriters
American emigrants to France
People with multiple sclerosis